Atelectotrauma, atelectrauma, cyclic atelectasis or repeated alveolar collapse and expansion (RACE) are medical terms for the damage caused to the lung by mechanical ventilation under certain conditions. When parts of the lung collapse at the end of expiration, due to a combination of a diseased lung state and a low functional residual capacity, then reopen again on inspiration, this repeated collapsing and reopening causes shear stress which has a damaging effect on the alveolus. Clinicians attempt to reduce atelectotrauma by ensuring adequate positive end-expiratory pressure (PEEP) to maintain the alveoli open in expiration. This is known as open lung ventilation. High frequency oscillatory ventilation (HFOV) with its use of 'super CPAP' is especially effective in preventing atelectotrauma since it maintains a very high mean airway pressure (MAP), equivalent to a very high PEEP. Atelectotrauma is one of several means by which mechanical ventilation may damage the lungs leading to ventilator-associated lung injury. The other means are volutrauma, barotrauma, rheotrauma and biotrauma. Attempts have been made to combine these factors in an all encompassing term: mechanical power.

References

Respiratory therapy
Pulmonology
Lung disorders
Emergency medicine
Intensive care medicine
Trauma types
Medical equipment